Popielewskie Lake  is a lake in Gmina Trzemeszno, Gniezno County, Greater Poland Voivodeship, north-central Poland, near the city of Gniezno. It is a ribbon lake in the Noteć river basin.

Lakes of Greater Poland Voivodeship
Gniezno County